USS Pennsylvania (SSBN-735) is a nuclear-powered, United States Navy  ballistic missile submarine that has been in commission since 1989. She is the fourth ship of the United States Navy to be named for the Commonwealth of Pennsylvania.

Construction and commissioning
The contract to build Pennsylvania was awarded to the Electric Boat Division of General Dynamics Corporation in Groton, Connecticut, on 29 November 1982 and her keel was laid down there on 10 January 1984.  She was launched on 23 April 1988, sponsored by Mrs. Marilyn Garrett, and commissioned on 9 September 1989.

Service history
On 29 September 1989, Pennsylvania ran aground as she entered the channel during her first visit to Port Canaveral, Florida. Tugboats freed her in about two hours.  A US Navy investigation determined that Pennsylvania was properly positioned in the channel, but the channel had been silted by the recent passing of Hurricane Hugo. Pennsylvania had been rerouted to Port Canaveral shortly after another submarine had struck a buoy that had repositioned in the entrance channel of Kings Bay. Still, it was thought that the channel to Port Canaveral had been unaffected. Pennsylvania received no damage. This was a rare occasion of a warship running aground and the commanding officer not being disciplined. Shortly after that, Pennsylvania departed on her first strategic deterrent patrol, which lasted 82 days.

In 2001, Pennsylvania won the Marjorie Sterrett Battleship Fund Award for the United States Atlantic Fleet.

In 2009, Pennsylvania was featured in an episode of the British television documentary series Big, Bigger, Biggest.

In 2012, Pennsylvania completed a mid-life -year Engineered Refueling Overhaul (ERO) at Puget Sound Naval Shipyard, where her reactor was refueled for an estimated 25 more years of service.

On 14 June 2014, Pennsylvania completed a record-setting 140-day strategic deterrent patrol. This is the longest strategic deterrent patrol completed since the beginning of the Poseidon C3 missile program in the 1970s.

In popular culture 
In Tom Clancy's 1994 novel Debt of Honor, Pennsylvania is one of several submarines sent to deal with a Japanese invasion of the Northern Mariana Islands. She becomes the first US nuclear submarine to sink an enemy warship when she fires a torpedo at a Japanese Maritime Self-Defense Force hunter-killer (SSK)-type submarine.
In season 6 of Fear the Walking Dead, Pennsylvania is revealed to have been beached on the shores of Galveston, Texas during unknown circumstances. A doomsday cult seeks the sub's launch keys to use Pennsylvania's nuclear missiles to destroy what's left of the world with the help of the sub's former Weapons Officer. Despite the protagonists' efforts, the cult manages to fire one nuclear missile with multiple warheads. In the episode Pennsylvania, the sub's name and identification number can be seen in a photograph in the Weapon Officer's old bunk. The crew is revealed to have perished in the event that beached Pennsylvania, leaving them as zombies roaming the boat.
In season 7 of Fear the Walking Dead, Pennsylvania acts as the home of Morgan Jones and Grace following the nuclear detonations across Texas, the two having cleared Pennsylvania of zombies and turned the boat into a haven from the nuclear fallout. The vessel acts as Morgan's base of operations throughout the season as he prepares to go to war. However, Pennsylvania has to be abandoned for good in "The Raft" after a radiation leak occurs in the engine compartment.
Pennsylvania is the main setting of the webisode Dead in the Water, which focuses on the history of the sub and her crew following the start of the zombie apocalypse with the crew becoming zombies following one of them dying of appendicitis, turning and then spreading the zombie infection. Ultimately, only eight out of the one hundred and fifty-five crewmembers survive and escape. The webisode takes place from the perspective of Lieutenant Jason Riley, the sub's weapon officer, who was a recurring antagonist in season 6 of Fear The Walking Dead.

References

External links
USS Pennsylvania website

 Video: The Largest Submarine in the U.S. Navy

 

Ships built in Groton, Connecticut
Ohio-class submarines
Cold War submarines of the United States
United States submarine accidents
Maritime incidents in 1989
Nuclear submarines of the United States Navy
1988 ships
Submarines of the United States